is a Japanese footballer currently playing as a midfielder for Fujieda MYFC.

Career statistics

Club
.

Notes

References

External links

1995 births
Living people
Japanese footballers
Association football midfielders
Juntendo University alumni
Japan Football League players
J3 League players
Sony Sendai FC players
Fujieda MYFC players